Joshua James McNally (born 21 August 1990) is an English rugby union lock for Bath Rugby in the Premiership Rugby, England's top division of rugby union. He is also a Royal Air Force weapons technician and has been in the RAF since 2009.

Rugby career
McNally initially played rugby solely for the Royal Air Force, but in 2012 he was posted to RAF Brize Norton allowed to join Henley Hawks as part of the Royal Air Force Rugby Union Centre of Excellence Scheme. After impressing in a pre-season match McNally earned a move to Premiership Rugby side London Welsh in June 2014.

In January 2017, after relegation to the RFU Championship in the summer of 2017, McNally was released by London Welsh to allow him to join London Irish with immediate effect.  In January 2019 Bath announced that McNally would join them in the summer of 2019.

Personal life
In December 2017 McNally underwent heart surgery to correct a case of Patent foramen ovale, and was later described as having suffered a stroke.

References

1990 births
Living people
Bath Rugby players
English rugby union players
London Irish players
London Welsh RFC players
Rugby union locks
Royal Air Force airmen
Rugby union players from Cambridgeshire
England international rugby union players